Ethnic religions (also "indigenous religions") are generally defined as religions which are related to a particular ethnic group, and often seen as a defining part of that ethnicity's culture, language, and customs.

Africa

 Ancient Egyptian religion
 Akan religion (Akans of the Gold Coast)
 Bantu religion (Bantu of Central/Southern Africa)
 Berber religion (Berbers of northern Africa)
 Coptic Christianity (Copts of Egypt)
 Mbuti religion (Mbuti of Congo and central Sudan)
 Odinani (Igbo of southeastern Nigeria)
 Serer religion (Serer of Senegal and northern West Africa)
 Vodun (Fon and Ewe of Benin and southwestern Nigeria)
 Waaqeffanna (Oromo people of Ethiopia and Kenya)
 Yoruba religion (Yoruba of southwestern Nigeria and southern Benin)

Asia
 Ahom religion (Ahom people of the north-east India)
 Alawites (Alawis of Syria)
 Armenian mythology 
 Bon (Tibetans)
 Chinese folk religion, Taoism (Han Chinese)
 Dongbaism (Nakhi from the foothills of the Himalayas)
 Donyi-Polo (Arunachali of Northeastern India)
 Dravidian folk religion of southern India
 Druze
 Indigenous Philippine folk religions
 Judaism (Jewish people)
 Kaharingan (Dayaks of Indonesia)
 Kalash religion (Kalash people of Pakistan)                                                                                                                       
 Kejawen (Javanese people of Indonesia)
 Kirant Mundhum (Kirat of the south-western flanks of the Himalayas)
 Korean shamanism or Muism (Koreans)
 Kurdish Alevism (Kurds of eastern Anatolia, particularly Dersim)
 Mandaeism (Mandaeans of southern Mesopotamia)
 Maronite Christianity (Maronites of Lebanon)
 Muong ethnic religion (Muong people of Vietnam)
 Parmalim (Bataks of Indonesia)
 Qiang folk religion (Qiang people)
 Ryukyuan religion, Ijun (Ryukyuans of the Ryukyu Islands near Taiwan)
 Samaritanism (Samaritans)
 Sanamahism (Meitei of Northeastern India)
 Sarnaism (Adivasi of India)
 Shabakism (Shabaks in Iraq)
 Shinto (Japanese)
 Sunda Wiwitan (Sundanese people of Indonesia)
 Syriac Christianity (Assyrian people in Syria, Iraq, Turkey and Iran. Saint Thomas Christians in India)
 Tai folk religion (Tai peoples of Mainland Southeast Asia)
 Tengrism (Turks, Mongolians, Hungarians)
 Uatsdin (Ossetians)
 Vietnamese folk religion (Vietnamese)
 Yahwism (Ancient Israelites)
 Yarsanism (Kurds of northern Iraq and western Iran)
 Yazdânism (related to Kurdish Alevism, Yarsanism, and Yazidism)
 Yazidism
 Yupik religion (Yupik of Alaska and Eastern Russia)
 Non-specific:
 Central Asian folk religions
 Iranian religions
 Tai folk religion in Laos Thailand and some part of Myanmar.
 Siberian folk religions
 Turco-Mongol religion of Northeast Asia

Americas

 Acadians (Acadia)
 Anishinaabe traditional beliefs (Anishinaabe)
 Inuit religion (Inuit of North America and Greenland)
 Maya religion (Maya; Guatemalans)
 Ancient Mexica religion, Santa Muerte worship (Mestizo/Mexicans and Mexican-Americans)
 Guarani religion, San La Muerte worship in Paraguay and north of Argentina
 Yupik religion (Yupik of Alaska and Eastern Russia)
 Rastafari (Jamaican people)
 Haitian Vodou (Haitian people)
 Hoodoo (African Americans)
 Muisca religion (Muisca people and colombian Mestizos)
 Umbanda (Afro-Brazilians and Afro-Uruguayans)
 Candomblé (Afro-Brazilians)
 Obeah (Afro-Caribbeans)
 Brujeria (Latin Americans/Mestizos)

Europe

 Adyghe Habze of Circassia in the Northwestern Caucasus
 Ancient Balkan religions (Dacians, Thracians, and Illyrians)
 Baltic religions of Lithuania, Latvia and Western Russia
 Basque religion (Basques of the western end of the Pyrenees)
 Ancient Celtic religion (Ancient Britons, Cumbrians, Gaels, Manx, Picts, Gallaeci, Gauls, Belgae, etc of what is now Great Britain, Ireland, France, Belgium, Iberia, Asia Minor and other parts of Europe.)
 Etruscan religion (Etruscans of the central Italian peninsula)
 Finnic religion (Ludes, Olonets, Veps, Izhorians, Votes, Livonians, Võros and Setos of eastern Scandinavia and the eastern Baltic)
 Ancient Georgian religion (pre-Christian Colchis of the southern Caucasus)
 Germanic paganism (pre-Christian Germanic peoples)
 Ancient Greek religion (pre-Christian Greeks)
 Mari native religion (Mari people)
 Norse religion (pre-Christian Norsemen and Vikings of Scandinavia)
 Ancient Roman religion (pre-Christian Romans)
 Sami religion (Sami people of Fennoscandia)
 Slavic paganism (Slavs of Eastern and Southeastern Europe)
 Vainakh (Nakhs of the Caucasus)
 Non-specific:
 Folk Catholicism

Oceania 
 Indigenous Australian
 Māori religion (Māori people)
 Modekngei (Palauan people)

See also
 Folk religion
 List of Neopagan movements
 Neopaganism
 List of religions and spiritual traditions
 Shamanism

References 

 
Religion-related lists